Douglas Crawford McMurtrie (July 20, 1888 – September 29, 1944) was an American typeface designer, graphic designer, historian, author and bibliographer of printing.

Early career
McMurtrie was born in Belmar, New Jersey and attended Massachusetts Institute of Technology.  After leaving school without a degree, he worked as a newspaper reporter, statistician, free-lance designer, and printing broker.  After several years, his design work came to the attention of Ingalls Kimball, who appointed McMurtrie general manager of the Cheltenham Press.  He subsequently served as printing manager of the Columbia University Printing Office, the Arbor Press, and Condé Nast Press.

Involvement with design and typography
During this period McMurtrie designed two type faces and helped design the format of the New Yorker magazine.  He was instrumental in forming the Continental Type Founders Association, which imported types from Europe, serving as the company’s first vice-president.  He also imported several faces from Europe on his own, including Cochin and Didot.  During 1925/26, he succeeded Frederic Goudy as editor of the prestigious Ars Typographica magazine.

Later career
After another period of free-lancing, McMurtrie moved to Chicago, where he spent a year as typographic director of the Cuneo Press before leaving to become director of advertising and typography at Ludlow Typograph Company.  Though he designed one typeface for Ludlow, his duties there primarily consisted of writing advertising copy.  He held this position until the end of his life.

Scholarly work
While at Ludlow, McMurtrie was allowed much time for research, resulting in many books, including one volume (of a planned four) of A History of Printing in the United States, and later The Book: the Story of Printing & Bookmaking, both of which won much acclaim.  Having established himself as one of the most important bibliographers of printing, McMurtrie was appointed to head up the Works Progress Administration’s American Imprints Inventory.  This project resulted in thirty-five publications as well as more than fifteen million documents being deposited in the Library of Congress.

Personal life
McMurtrie was a large man, weighing over 300 pounds, and was known for his engaging personality.  He was much involved in charities for the crippled.  He married Adele Kohler in 1915 and they had three children.  He died suddenly of a heart attack in Evanston, Illinois at age 55.

Typefaces
 McMurtrie Tile (1922, Continental), capitals only, based on an 18th-century Dutch face by Jacques François Rosart.
 Vanity Fair Tile (1923, privately cast by Continental for Condé Nast Press), capitals only, based on an 18th-century Dutch face by J.F. Rosart.
 Ultra-Modern series
 Ultra-Modern Roman (1928, Ludlow), designed in collaboration with Aaron Borad and Leslie Sprunger.
 Ultra-Modern bold (1930, Ludlow)
 Ultra-Modern Medium Italic (1930, Ludlow)

Books
 The History of Typefounding in the United States, privately printed, N.Y.C., 1925.
 The Golden Book; the story of fine books and bookmaking Pascal Covici Publishing Inc, N.Y.C., 1927.
 Type Design, Bridgeman Publishers, Pelham, New York, 1927.
 The Fichet Letter: the earliest document ascribing to Gutenberg the invention of printing, Press of Ars Typographica, N.Y.C., 1927.
 Modern Typography & Layout, Eyncourt Press, Chicago, 1929.
 Active-age Typography, Chicago, 1930.
 Concerning Quotations, New York, 1934
 A History of Printing in the United States: The Story of the Introduction of the Press and of Its History and Influence during the Pioneer Period in Each State of the Union,, in collaboration with Albert H. Allen, R.R. Bowker, N.Y.C., 1936.
 The Book: the Story of Printing & Bookmaking, Oxford University Press, N.Y.C., 1943.

References

Further reading
 Wells, James M., “Douglas Crawford McMurtrie,” in Dictionary of American Biography, Supplement Three, 1941–1945, Charles Scribner’s Sons, N.Y.C., 1973, pp. 492 – 493, .
 Rollins, Carl Purington American Type Designers and Their Work. in Print, V. 4, p. 18.
 McGrew, Mac, American Metal Typefaces of the Twentieth Century, Oak Knoll Books, New Castle Delaware, 1993, .

External links
A sample of McMurtrie's Ultra-Modern Roman typeface
Douglas C. McMurtrie Papers at the Newberry Library

Bibliographers
American typographers and type designers
1888 births
1944 deaths
American graphic designers
Massachusetts Institute of Technology alumni
People from Belmar, New Jersey
Works Progress Administration workers